Deortivo Warnes is a football club from Santa Cruz, Bolivia currently playing at Santa Cruz Primera A.
The club was founded September 23, 1996 by Brazilian Engineers, and they play their home games at the Estadio Samuel Vaca Jimenez.

References

Association football clubs established in 1996
Destroyers